Costicǎ Olaru (born August 1, 1960) is a Romanian sprint canoer who competed in the early 1980s. He won a bronze medal in the C-1 500 m event at the 1984 Summer Olympics in Los Angeles.

Olaru won two medals at the 1983 ICF Canoe Sprint World Championships with a gold in the C-1 500 m and silver in the C-1 1000 m events.

References

External links 
 
 
 

1960 births
Canoeists at the 1984 Summer Olympics
Living people
Olympic canoeists of Romania
Olympic bronze medalists for Romania
Romanian male canoeists
Olympic medalists in canoeing
ICF Canoe Sprint World Championships medalists in Canadian
Medalists at the 1984 Summer Olympics